Megachile hohmanni is a species of bee in the family Megachilidae. It was described by Tkalcu in 1993.

References

Hohmanni
Insects described in 1993